Asyngenes is a genus of beetles in the family Cerambycidae, containing the following species:

 Asyngenes affinis Breuning, 1942
 Asyngenes chalceolus Bates, 1880
 Asyngenes strandiellus Breuning, 1943
 Asyngenes vittipennis Breuning, 1942
 Asyngenes venezuelensis Breuning, 1943

References

Apomecynini
Cerambycidae genera